Spark of Being is a 3-disc box set of music written by Dave Douglas and performed by his electric band, Keystone.  Written for the Bill Morrison film by the same name, Spark of Being was commissioned by Stanford University and released by Douglas's Greenleaf Music record label in 2010.

Background
Stanford University commissioned Dave Douglas to write a soundtrack for Bill Morrison's Frankenstein film.

Recording and music
The musicians were part of Douglas's established sextet known as Keystone. In the studio, Douglas encouraged improvisation, so that he would have enough material to edit for release. The music "makes use of the library of sounds at Stanford University's computer music department, which DJ Olive weaves into the live palette of keyboard, bass, drums and Douglas himself on trumpet".

Release and reception
The Spark of Being set was released by Greenleaf Music on September 21, 2010. Greenleaf also issued the three CDs separately: Spark of Being: Soundtrack, which was from the film; Spark of Being: Expand; and Spark of Being: Burst. The first was issued on June 22, 2010; the second was released on September 6 of the same year. All were released by Greenleaf Music, which issued the set of 3 CDs

The Daily Telegraph's reviewer wrote: "The combination of poetic suggestiveness, musical invention and instrumental brilliance is a marvel, and all the more effective for being understated." The JazzTimes reviewer wrote that "Douglas has composed tunes that could work with any instrumentation, and the samples are an extra flavoring – not a gimmick the whole thing depends upon".

Track listing

Disc 1: Soundtrack
 Creature Theme, 7:08
 Spark Of Being, 3:45
 Observer, 4:02
 Travelogue, 7:24
 Prologue, 4:27
 Tree Ring Circus, 6:29
 Creature And Friend, 2:56
 Is It You?, 2:43
 Chroma, 7:53
 Observer Claymation, 3:51
 Observer Animation, 1:02
 Split Personality, 6:21
 Creature Alone, 1:40

Disc 2: Expand
 Spark Of Being, 3:44
 Creature, 7:33
 Tree Ring Circus, 5:42
 Observer, 4:03
 Chroma, 7:42
 Travelogue, 7:56
 Prologue, 5:52

Disc 3: Burst
 Leaving London, 4:26
 Creature Code, 5:02
 The Growing Tree, 4:40
 Vitalism, 7:20
 Creature Discomfort, 8:08
 Split Personality Infinitive, 7:42
 Tree Ring Vamp, 2:14
 Travelogue (Complete), 7:24
 Leaving London Reprise, 1:58
 Creature Theme (Closure), 7:00

Personnel
Dave Douglas – trumpet
Marcus Strickland – tenor saxophone
Adam Benjamin – keyboards
Brad Jones – bass
Gene Lake – drums
DJ Olive – laptop/turntable

References

2010 albums
Dave Douglas (trumpeter) albums
Greenleaf Music albums